Rc-o319 is a bat-derived strain of severe acute respiratory syndrome–related coronavirus collected in Little Japanese horseshoe bats (Rhinolophus cornutus) from sites in Iwate, Japan. Its has 81% similarity to SARS-CoV-2 and is the earliest strain branch of the SARS-CoV-2 related coronavirus.

References 

SARS-CoV-2
Bat virome
Coronaviridae
Animal virology
Sarbecovirus
Zoonoses